Renato D'Aiello is an Italian saxophonist who lives in the United Kingdom.

Albums
Like Someone in Love was recorded with Damon Brown and features seven songs, among them well-known titles like Like Someone in Love and I Remember You.

Of his record Sintetico, with Nicola Muresu on bass, Keith Copeland on drums and Andrea Pozza on piano, the Guardian critic wrote: "D'Aiello's weighty, behind-the-beat sound shows how a poetic imagination can rekindle a long-gone style without nostalgia".

Discography
As leader
 Introducing (Spotlite, 2001)
 The Invisible Session (Schema, 2006)
 Sintetico (33 Jazz, 2007)
 Between Two Worlds (33 Jazz, 2013)
 Satori: The Angel (33 Jazz, 2015)

As sideman
 Tenorama John Williams (Spotlite, 2003)
 More Questions Than Answers, Louise Gibbs (33 Jazz, 2005)
 Ballads, Nicola Muresu, Bruno Montrone (33 Jazz, 2014)
 Blues on the Run, Damon Brown

As guest
 Ohm Guru – Funk My Ass (1995)
 DJ Rodriguez – World Wide Funk (1998)
 Paolo Fedreghini & Marco Bianchi – Circus in C Minor (2004)
 Bobby Blanco & Miki Moto – Black Sugar (2005)
 The Invisible Session – To the Powerful (2005)

References 

Living people
Italian jazz saxophonists
Male saxophonists
Jazz alto saxophonists
Jazz tenor saxophonists
Berklee College of Music alumni
1959 births
21st-century saxophonists
21st-century Italian male musicians
Male jazz musicians